Wardleworth was a township at the geographic centre of the Parish of Rochdale, in Salford Hundred, Lancashire, England. The principal estate of the township was Buckley. Though the administrative territory has long been abolished, the name continues as a geographic reference frame for that part of Rochdale.

Wardleworth was a township that included territory to the northeast of the town of Rochdale, including the hamlets of Buckley, Crankey Shaw and Hamer Fold, and, although close to the village of Wardle, Wardleworth did not contain the settlement, which was instead within the neighbouring township of Wuerdle and Wardle.

In 1830, Wardleworth was recorded to have 6,451 inhabitants.

The Buckley and Entwistle families are recorded to have been the principal landowners of this township, with Buckley Hall being the seat of the estateholders for many years.

See also
Butterworth (ancient township)
Wardleworth railway station

References and external links

History of Rochdale
History of Lancashire
Areas of Rochdale
Populated places disestablished in 1894
1894 disestablishments in England